Dream Big: Engineering Our World is a 2017 American documentary short about modern engineering and its significance.  It was directed by Greg MacGillivray and narrated by Jeff Bridges.

Participants
The following people appeared in the documentary:

Avery Bang
Steve Burrows
Angelica Hernandez
Fredi Lajvardi
Menzer Pehlivan

Release
The film was shown at the California Science Center on February 17, 2017.

Reception
The film has a 100% rating on Rotten Tomatoes.  Sandie Angulo Chen of Common Sense Media awarded the film four stars out of five.

Nick Schager of Variety gave the film a positive review and wrote that it "proves a rousing, and ravishing, call-to-engineering-arms for future generations, and should receive a welcome reception from its young target audience."

Sheri Linden of The Hollywood Reporter also gave the film a positive review and wrote, "But though the shifts can be abrupt, the film provides an overview of a huge topic with admirable concision."

References

External links
 
 
 

2017 short documentary films
American short documentary films
2017 films
Short films directed by Greg MacGillivray
MacGillivray Freeman Films films
IMAX documentary films
2010s English-language films
2010s American films